In mathematics, a filter on a set  informally gives a notion of which subsets  are "large". Filter quantifiers are a type of logical quantifier which, informally, say whether or not a statement is true for "most" elements of  Such quantifiers are often used in combinatorics, model theory (such as when dealing with ultraproducts), and in other fields of mathematical logic where (ultra)filters are used.

Background

Here we will use the set theory convention, where a filter  on a set  is defined to be an order-theoretic filter in the poset  that is, a subset of  such that:

 For all  we have ;
 For all  if  then 

Given a filter  on a set  we say a subset  is -stationary if, for all  we have

Definition

 is -stationary

for every first-order formula  with one free variable. These also admit alternative definitions as

When  is an ultrafilter, the two quantifiers defined above coincide, and we will often use the notation  instead. In cases where the filter is clear, we might omit mention of

Properties

The filter quantifiers  and  satisfy the following logical identities, for all formulae :

 Duality: 
 Weakening: 
 Conjunction:

 
 Disjunction:

 
 If  are filters on  then:

 

Additionally, if  is an ultrafilter, the two filter quantifiers coincide:  Renaming this quantifier  the following properties hold:

 Negation: 
 Weakening: 
 Conjunction: 
 Disjunction: 

In general, filter quantifiers do not commute with each other, nor with the usual  and  quantifiers.

Examples

 If  is the trivial filter on  then unpacking the definition, we have  and  This recovers the usual  and  quantifiers. 
 Let  be the "measure filter" on  generated by all subsets  with Lebesgue measure  The above construction gives us "measure quantifiers":  holds iff  holds almost everywhere, and  holds iff  holds on a set of positive measure.
 Suppose  is the principal filter on some set  Then, we have  and 
 If  is the principal ultrafilter of an element  then we have

Use

The utility of filter quantifiers is that they often give a more concise or clear way to express certain mathematical ideas. For example, take the definition of convergence of a real-valued sequence: a sequence  converges to a point  if

Using the Fréchet quantifier  as defined above, we can give a nicer (equivalent) definition:

Filter quantifiers are especially useful in constructions involving filters. As an example, suppose that  has a binary operation  defined on it. There is a natural way to extend  to  the set of ultrafilters on :

With an understanding of the ultrafilter quantifier, this definition is reasonably intuitive. It says that  is the collection of subsets  such that, for most  (according to ) and for most  (according to ), the sum  is in  Compare this to the equivalent definition without ultrafilter quantifiers:

The meaning of this is much less clear.

This increased intuition is also evident in proofs involving ultrafilters. For example, if  is associative on  using the first definition of  it trivially follows that  is associative on  Proving this using the second definition takes a lot more work.

See also

References

Quantifier (logic)